Harmon Bay is an embayment at the north end of Bear Peninsula, about  wide, defined by the northeast shore of Moore Dome, the terminus of Park Glacier and the northwest end of Gurnon Peninsula, on the Walgreen Coast of Marie Byrd Land, Antarctica. It was mapped by the United States Geological Survey from surveys and U.S. Navy aerial photographs, 1959–66, and was named by the Advisory Committee on Antarctic Names after Commander Robert H. Harmon, Executive Officer on the USCGC Burton Island (WAGB-283) during U.S. Navy Operation Deep Freeze, 1969.

References

6390

Bays of Marie Byrd Land